Standoff  is a 2016 American thriller film starring Laurence Fishburne and Thomas Jane.

Plot
A young girl named Bird is dropped off by a man to visit two graves, where she witnesses and photographs a hitman (Laurence Fishburne) killing people at a burial. When the man, Roger, comes looking for her, the hitman kills him and turns to her (noticing her camera), but she flees into the woods and arrives at the house of a man named Carter (Thomas Jane), who vows to protect her. The hitman enters the house and shoots Carter, who shoots him in return. Carter is stuck upstairs and the hitman downstairs. Carter sends the girl for some light bulbs, which he breaks and throws down the stairs.  Bird tells Carter what happened in the cemetery and that she has a picture of the hitman; Carter directs her to hide the film in the toilet tank. The hitman finds a picture of Carter in military uniform with his wife and son and goads him over their leaving him.

A sheriff's deputy happens upon the abandoned cars at the cemetery.  In the house, Carter has a flashback about his son, who accidentally died when he fell on a piece of farming equipment Carter neglected to clean up. The hitman finds and reads a letter Carter had written his wife, taking blame for the death of their son. He antagonizes Carter whom he realizes was contemplating suicide.  While Bird and Carter talk about his family, the hitman fires his gun, which the deputy hears. The lights in the house start to fade and Carter realizes he needs to get Bird out as he cannot protect them both in the dark.

The deputy arrives while Carter is trying to get Bird out through a window. The hitman shoots the deputy through the door, scaring Bird, who goes back upstairs.  The hitman hides the deputy's car and starts to head back to the house, but Carter confronts him and tells him to leave. The hitman tries to goad him to shoot, guessing he only has the one shot. Carter relents because the hitman has taken the deputy's gun.  Inside, he tries to barter with Carter for the deputy's life. After breaking his fingers, he kills the deputy.

After a period of silence, Carter tells Bird to hide and heads downstairs. He hears creaking above him and finds the hitman's boots.  Realizing he has snuck onto the roof, Carter follows him back in through a window. Surprised, the hitman steps on the broken bulbs and falls down the stairs.  They resume their standoff. The hitman considers burning the house down but reconsiders his plan when he remembers he has Carter's cell phone.

As night falls, both men are injured and tired. A vehicle arrives and Carter sees that the hitman has called his wife, Mara, claiming he was worried about Carter.  He once again barters for the girl. Carter gives Bird the shotgun, instructing her to aim down the stairs and shoot if she sees the hitman. Angry that Carter came instead of the girl, the hitman shoots Carter in the knee.  As they argue, Bird descends the stairs to protect Carter. The lights flicker, distracting the hitman and Carter rushes him. He stabs the hitman repeatedly, but is shot as the lights go out. Mara runs outside and calls 911 and Bird approaches the hitman, who is dying. He tells her to shoot him but the trigger simply clicks; the round is a dud. Amused at his bad luck, the hitman refuses to kill Bird since he is already dying and no need to protect his identity anymore. She runs to Carter assuming the worst, but he is alive. Mara returns and the three embrace.

Cast
Laurence Fishburne as the Hitman
Thomas Jane as Carter Greene 
Ella Ballentine as Isabelle (Bird)
Jim Watson as Officer Jerry Baker
Joanna Douglas as Mara Greene
Laura de Carteret as Woman

Themes

The major theme in this movie is the titular "standoff" between good and evil.  This is evidenced by several obvious plot devices.  The villain is a professional hitman, an indisputably evil profession, while the hero is a veteran, a stereotypically noble profession.  The unnamed hitman murders several individuals without any discernible or explained motivation, making him inherently evil, while Carter is determined to do the "right thing" by protecting Bird despite having nothing to gain by it, making him inherently good.  The hitman wears only heavy, black clothes while Carter wears a lightweight white t-shirt.  Their positioning also establishes their paradigm: the hitman sits downstairs in the darkness while Carter remains upstairs in the light, implying that Carter has both the physical and moral high ground.  More subtly, the hitman lies frequently and is usually poorly lit (shadows on his face, red lighting) while Carter is honest about the fate of his family and is almost always cast in bright light showing his face.

Development
Thomas Jane was confirmed to join the cast on May 1, 2014.

It was shot in Ontario, Canada, in locations including Sault Ste Marie, Echo Bay and Bar River. Casting calls were held in September 2014.

Reception

It received mostly mixed reviews and has a score of 50% on Rotten Tomatoes. The Hollywood Reporter gave it a mixed review, calling it: "A solid if unsurprising B-movie whose title says it all". Writing for RogerEbert.com, Glenn Kenny awarded it one out of four stars, saying: "To give credit where it’s due, this lukewarm mess of a movie delivers what its title promises." Slant Magazine gave it a mixed review, saying: "Standoff isn't quite inspired, but it coasts on unexpected modesty of professionalism." The LA Times gave it a negative review, saying: "At the end of the very long day, not even Fishburne's dependable gravitas is able to pummel this stagy gab-fest into submission."

References

External links

2016 thriller films
Films about contract killing
American thriller films
Films shot in Sault Ste. Marie, Ontario
2016 films
Saban Films films
Films set in 2015
2016 directorial debut films
2010s American films